Phalonidia latipunctana is a species of moth of the family Tortricidae. It is found in the United States, where it has been recorded from California, Washington and Maine.

Adults have been recorded on wing in March and from May to September.

References

Moths described in 1879
Phalonidia